Plague is a 1979 Canadian-American science fiction film about a genetic engineering accident, a fertilizing bacterium that escapes from a laboratory in Canada. The film is also known internationally as Induced Syndrome (UK), M-3: The Gemini Strain or Mutation (USA).

Plot
When a group of scientist work to develop  a bacterium to increase food yields is delayed by bureaucratic processes, Dr. Celia Graham (Brenda Donahue) ignores protocols and develops a bacteria called M3.

The new bacteria is accidentally released and causes sickness in children and death in others around the world. The disease is highly contagious, and the epidemic increases geometrically. Dr. Graham is killed by the virus, while an infected but unaffected woman spreads the disease in the manner of Typhoid Mary.

Scientists Dr. Bill Fuller (Daniel Pilon) and  Dr. Jessica Morgan (Kate Reid) work tirelessly to develop an antidote to stop the contagion.

Cast
 Daniel Pilon as Dr. Bill Fuller
 Kate Reid as Dr. Jessica Morgan
 Celine Lomez as Margo Simar the Carrier
 Michael J. Reynolds as Dr. Dave McKay
 John Kerr as Escaping guard
  Brenda Donahue as Dr. Celia Graham

Release
The film was released theatrically in the United States by Group 1 International Distribution Organization Ltd. in January 1979.

The film was released on DVD in the United Kingdom from Prism Leisure Corporation as part of a 4-film collection (with Bram Stoker's Legend of the Mummy 2, Howling IV: The Original Nightmare and Night of the Living Dead) on October 7, 2002. It was also release individually from Prism Leisure, and by Digital Entertainment Ltd in 2008. As of 2018, the film has still not been officially released on DVD in the United States.

Reception

Creature Feature gave the movie two out of five stars. TV Guide found that the focus on the scientists in charge of finding the cure to be a plus, that overall the movie was laughable. Moira also gave the movie two stars, finding it dull and offereing nothing original in the plague movie genre. It also found the production values to be shabby and its portrayal of a biolab's operating procedues to be lacking.

Awards

Nominated for best picture at the 1979 Catalonian International Film Festival and winner of the best screenplay at the same festival.

References

External links

1979 films
Canadian science fiction films
1979 horror films
1970s science fiction horror films
English-language Canadian films
Canadian natural horror films
Films about viral outbreaks
1970s Canadian films